Jerome "Jerry" Lewis Avorn  (born February 13, 1948) is a Professor of Medicine at Harvard Medical School and Chief of the Division of Pharmacoepidemiology and Pharmacoeconomics at Brigham and Women’s Hospital. He invented the practice of "academic detailing" in which pharmacists, nurses, and physicians educate doctors about cost-effective prescribing practices using the same tactics that drug companies employ to market their products. He received a B.A. from Columbia University in 1969 and M.D. from Harvard Medical School in 1974.

Early life and education
Avorn was born in 1948, in New York City and grew up in Rockaway, Queens. While attending Columbia University during the opposition to the Vietnam War and American civil rights movement, he was a campus activist against the Vietnam War with his investigative journalism for the Columbia Daily Spectator. In the summer of 1969, he wrote Up Against the Ivy Wall with fellow Spectator journalists about the campus uprisings at Columbia.

Avorn graduated from Harvard Medical School with an M.D. in 1974.

Career
Avorn was a resident at the Cambridge Hospital in Cambridge, Massachusetts and then at the Beth Israel Hospital (now the Beth Israel Deaconess Medical Center in Boston, Massachusetts). He became an associate professor at Harvard Medical School in 1985 and a full professor in 2005.

In 1983, he published his first paper on academic detailing. The practice has been taken up by several hospitals and governments, such as Pennsylvania, Washington, DC, Kentucky, Australia, Israel, and Nova Scotia. His work on academic detailing was featured in The Wall Street Journal and on The Daily Show.

In 1996 he published "Reduction of Bacteriuria and Pyuria After Ingestion of Cranberry Juice" in the Journal of the American Medical Association (JAMA), which identified cranberry juice as an effective means of controlling urinary tract infections in elderly women.

Avorn is also past president of the International Society for Pharmacoepidemiology.

In 2004, he founded Alosa Health, a nonprofit organization that develops and implements academic detailing programs to improve prescribing.

Avorn's paper on coxibs was one of the first medical research papers to demonstrate that Vioxx increased some patients' risk of heart attack and stroke. In 2006 he testified as a plaintiff’s expert witness in the Vioxx litigation, but he donates all profit from his involvement to Alosa Health.

Avorn lives in Brookline, Massachusetts with his wife, community activist Karen Tucker. They have two children together.

Works
Avorn is the author of the 2004 book Powerful Medicines.

Notable research

References

External links 
 Official “Powerful Medicines” website
 Alosa Health 
 Advertising: As Drug Bill Soars, Some Doctors Get An 'Unsales' Pitch
 Dr. Avorn on The Daily Show
 New York Times Op Ed "The Sting of Ignorance"

1948 births
Living people
Columbia University alumni
Harvard Medical School alumni
Harvard Medical School faculty
People from Brookline, Massachusetts